Thomas Thurston Thomas (born 1948), also writing as Thomas T. Thomas and Thomas Wren, is primarily a science fiction author.

Thomas was born in Summit, New Jersey, in 1948. He attended Warren Area High School and graduated in 1966. He then attended Pennsylvania State University, graduating with honors in 1970 with a bachelor's degree in English Literature.

Books
The Doomsday Effect (writing as Thomas Wren) (1986)  Winner of the Compton Crook Award in 1987.
First Citizen (1987)
The Mask of Loki (1990) (with Roger Zelazny)
Crygender (1991)
ME: A Novel of Self-Discovery (1991)
Flare (1992) (with Roger Zelazny)
Mars Plus (1994) (with Frederik Pohl)
Trojan Horse (2010) (published as ebook)
Sunflowers (2010) (published as ebook)
The Judge's Daughter (2011) (published as ebook and paperback) (general fiction)
The Children of Possibility (2012) (published as ebook and paperback)
The Professor's Mistress (2013) (published as ebook and paperback) (general fiction)
Coming of Age (2014) (published as ebook and paperback in two volumes)
ME, Too: Loose in the Network (2016) (published as ebook and paperback)
The House at the Crossroads (2017) (published as ebook and paperback)
Medea's Daughter (2018) (published as ebook and paperback)
The Divina in the Troupe (2019) (published as ebook and paperback)
Revolt on the Iron Planet (2022) (published as ebook and paperback)

He has also contributed one title, An Honorable Defense (1988), to the Crisis of Empire series (with David Drake), and the novelette Hey Diddle Diddle to the fifth installment of the Man-Kzin Wars series (based in the Known Space Universe of Larry Niven).

References

Facebook: Thomas T. Thomas

External links
Thomas T. Thomas

20th-century American novelists
American male novelists
American science fiction writers
Living people
1948 births
American male short story writers
20th-century American short story writers
20th-century American male writers